Codonosiga is a genus of choanoflagellate in the family Codonosigidae. It is currently considered as a synonym of Codosiga, with 29 species in the family.

References

Footnotes
 James-Clark, H. (1868). On the Spongia Ciliatae as Infusoria Flagellata; or, observations on the structure, animality, and relationship of Leucosolenia botryoides, Bowerbank. Memoirs of the Boston Society of Natural History, 1 (3): 305–340. Also published in the Proceedings of this Society on June 20, 1866 (vol. 11, p. 15), in the American Journal of Science in November 1866, in the Annals and Magazine of Natural History in January 1867, and in the Annals and Magazine of Natural History in 1868 (4th ser., vol. 1: 133–142, 188–215, 250–264).
 Stein, F. von (1878). Der Organismus der Infusionsthiere nach eigenen Forschungen in systematischer Reihenfolge bearbeitet III. Abtheilung. Die Naturgeschicnte der Flagellaten oder Geisselinfusorien. Mit 24 Küpfertaflen. I. Halfte, den noch nicht abgeschlossenen allgemeinen Theil nebst Erklärung der Sämmtlichen Abbildungen enthaltend. pp. 1–154, pls I-XXIV. Leipzig: Verlag von WilhEngelmann.

External links 
 
 
 Codonosiga at AlgaeBase

Eukaryote genera
Craspedida